Nymphaea elegans, the tropical royalblue waterlily, is a species of aquatic plants in the family Nymphaeaceae. It is found in Louisiana, Florida and Texas, in the United States, in Oaxaca in Mexico and in Antioquia in Colombia.

References 

 CONABIO. 2009. Catálogo taxonómico de especies de México. 1. In Capital Nat. México. CONABIO, Mexico City.
 Correll, D. S. & M. C. Johnston. 1970. Man. Vasc. Pl. Texas i–xv, 1–1881. The University of Texas at Dallas, Richardson.
 Godfrey, R. K. & J. W. Wooten. 1981. Aquatic Wetland Pl. S.E. U.S. Dicot. 1–944. Univ. Georgia Press, Athens.
 Idárraga-Piedrahita, A., R. D. C. Ortiz, R. Callejas Posada & M. Merello. (eds.) 2011. Fl. Antioquia: Cat. 2: 9–939. Universidad de Antioquia, Medellín.
 Long, R. W. & O. K. Lakela. 1971. Fl. Trop. Florida i–xvii, 1–962. University of Miami Press, Coral Cables.
 Wiersema, J. H. & C. B. Hellquist. 1993. Nymphaeaceae. 62 pp.
 Wunderlin, R. P. 1998. Guide Vasc. Pl. Florida i–x, 1–806. University Press of Florida, Gainesville.

External links 
 
 

elegans
Plants described in 1851
Flora of Florida
Flora of Louisiana
Flora of Texas
Flora of Oaxaca
Flora of Colombia